Zaraza  is a Venezuelan city and the capital of Pedro Zaraza Municipality, located in eastern Guárico in the region of Los Llanos. It is named after a Venezuelan soldier who fought with Gregor MacGregor.

Zaraza is one of the major cities of Guárico State, along with Calabozo, Valle de la Pascua, and San Juan de los Morros.

Cities in Guárico